William G. Thompson (July 19, 1908 – February 8, 1956) was an American rower who competed in the 1928 Summer Olympics.

In 1928, he rowed as the number four man in the American boat, which was made up of the University of California crew and won the gold medal in the eights.

Graduated from University of California in 1929 with BS degrees in electrical and mechanical engineering; married Sally Lincoln in 1933 with whom he had two sons, William G Thompson Jr. (1936) and Bruce W Thompson (1945). Active in community service, he was president of the school board and the planning commission of the City of El Segundo, CA at the time of his death.

References

External links
 
 
 
 

1908 births
1956 deaths
American male rowers
Olympic gold medalists for the United States in rowing
Rowers at the 1928 Summer Olympics
Medalists at the 1928 Summer Olympics